Anna Maria Williams (25 January 1839 – 5 May 1929) was a notable New Zealand teacher and school principal. She was born in Waimate North, Northland, New Zealand, in 1839.

References

1839 births
1929 deaths
New Zealand schoolteachers
People from the Bay of Islands